David John Hibbert (born 28 January 1986) is an English former footballer who played as a forward; he is now working as a coach at Stoke City.

Starting his professional career with Port Vale in 2004, the following year he was signed in controversial fashion by Preston North End – who eventually paid Vale £45,000 for his services. Following loans out to Rotherham United and Bradford City, he transferred to Shrewsbury Town in 2007 for £75,000. He managed to become a key first team player for the "Shrews", before leaving them for Peterborough United in 2010. He did not play a competitive game after picking up a serious injury in November 2010, and announced his retirement from football in April 2013. He returned to the game with Nuneaton Town in October 2013 on a part-time basis, before moving on to Tamworth in June 2014. He joined AFC Telford United in June 2015, before retiring at the end of the 2016–17 season.

Playing career

Port Vale
Born in Eccleshall, Staffordshire, Hibbert started his career at League One Port Vale, rising through the ranks from the age nine years old. He made three starts and seven substitute appearances in first season with Vale; and his promising maiden season was restricted only by a head injury sustained at Milton Keynes Dons. His two goals for the club both came in his second starting appearance in a 3–1 win over Luton Town on 26 February 2005. In June 2005 Championship side Preston North End signed him to a contract. As Hibbert was under the age of 23, the fee was decided by a tribunal according to UEFA regulations. Preston were ordered to pay Port Vale £35,000 up front with add ons of £10,000 for each 10 of his first 50 appearances for Preston (Vale would only receive the first of these due to him only making 13 appearances in total for Preston); a £280,000 bonus if Preston achieved promotion to the Premiership; plus a 25% sell-on clause if Hibbert was sold on. Vale chairman Bill Bratt was highly disappointed with the news and stated: "I believe he has potential, and he is worth a lot more than we have ended up with." Meanwhile, Preston manager Billy Davies stated that: "We are very fortunate to get this young lad because there were several clubs interested. We think his finishing is very good and – like David Nugent – he is very quick, but to be honest I think he is quite a way from first-team action."

Preston North End
He started just one game for Preston in 2005–06, playing the full ninety minutes of a 1–1 draw with Crystal Palace in the FA Cup. The young striker squandered numerous chances to win the tie. He also made twelve substitute appearances in both league and cup competitions.

In July 2006 he joined Rotherham United on a six-month loan. He played 22 times for the "Millers", scoring two goals. Returning to Deepdale in January 2007, he was immediately loaned out to Bradford City on a one-month deal. He made his City debut in their 1–0 win against his old club Port Vale at Vale Park on 6 January. The loan was later extended, keeping him at Valley Parade until April 2007. During his prolonged stay at Valley Parade, however, Hibbert suffered an ankle injury on 28 February and did not feature again for the "Bantams" after tests revealed he had ruptured ligaments. He remained at Bradford for a further month so that caretaker manager David Wetherall could see if the injury improved, before he returned to Preston in April.

Shrewsbury Town
In May 2007, having never started a league game for North End, Hibbert was transfer listed. The next month he was sold to League Two side Shrewsbury Town for a nominal £75,000 fee. He hoped Shrewsbury could improve his game. He scored the first goal at Shrewsbury's New Meadow stadium, in a pre-season friendly, his first match in "Shrews" colours. Along with this, he was also the first ever league goalscorer at New Meadow, scoring a penalty against former club Bradford on 18 August. His strong performances that month earned him a nomination for the division's Player of the Month award, though he lost out to Morecambe defender Jim Bentley. With four goals in five games in September he was a contender for the award for a second successive month, though this time he lost out to Hereford United's Trevor Benjamin. Despite suffering from a hamstring injury in mid-season, Hibbert finished the 2007–08 season as Shrewsbury's top goalscorer with twelve goals in 46 games. His goals were crucial in helping the club to avoid relegation out of the Football League.

Following a solid start to the 2008–09 campaign, Hibbert was sidelined with a broken nose picked up in training, before failing to start a game between October and March due to a foot injury. He finished the season having scored just three goals in 25 appearances. He spent the following summer undertaking physiotherapy sessions in an attempt to cure his long-standing foot injury.

Hibbert started the 2009–10 season in fantastic form, building a strong partnership with Nathan Elder. A brief spell on the sidelines through an achilles injury slowed up his impressive flurry of goals, but he then scored five on the trot, against Macclesfield Town, Bradford City, Chesterfield, Burton Albion and Dagenham & Redbridge; eventually hitting six goals in eight games. Though he suffered a groin injury late in the season and missed out on his target of twenty goals, his fifteen goals made him Shrewsbury's top goalscorer for the second time in three seasons earned him the club's Player of the Year award.

Peterborough United
He turned down a new contract with Shrewsbury, and instead signed a three-year deal with Peterborough United in May 2010, becoming Gary Johnson's first signing as manager of Peterborough. Hibbert scored his first goal for the club on 11 September 2010, in a 5–2 win over Oldham Athletic. This was to be his only goal of the season, as he started just one Football League Trophy game, and was limited to eleven substitute appearances in other competitions thanks to injury and the form of other players. The success of Aaron McLean and Craig Mackail-Smith's strike partnership restricted to a cameo role in the club's promotion out of League One, before a serious knee injury sustained in November kept him sidelined for eight months and threatened to end his whole career. The injury caused him to miss the entirety of the 2011–12 and 2012–13 seasons, and he announced his retirement from football in April 2013.

Non-league
In October 2013, Hibbert made a return to playing football in the Conference Premier with Nuneaton Town after joining on non-contract terms. He went on to feature 28 times for Brian Reid's "Boro" in the 2013–14 season, scoring four goals.

In June 2014, Hibbert signed a contract with Conference North side Tamworth, and was joined at the club on the same day by former Nuneaton Town colleagues Kevin Thornton and Danny Sleath. On 21 March, Hibbert scored his first hat-trick for the club in a 3–1 win over local rivals Hednesford Town. He finished the 2014–15 season with eight goals in 35 league games.

Hibbert joined AFC Telford United in June 2015, and also began coaching the Stoke City under-21s. However, he admitted that he was hurt by Telford's poor form as they went on to finish just one point above the relegation zone at the end of the 2015–16 season. He hit two goals in 29 games in the 2016–17 campaign as the "Bucks" posted a 17th-place finish.

Coaching career
Hibbert went into coaching after retiring as a player, and by April 2019 was the head coach of the under-15's and under-16's at the Stoke City Academy.

Personal life
In May 2013 he was studying a sports science degree at Loughborough University, taking his UEFA B coaching badge, and playing cricket for Eccleshall.

Career statistics

Honours
Individual
Shrewsbury Town Player of the Year: 2010

References

External links

1986 births
Living people
Footballers from Staffordshire
English footballers
Association football forwards
Port Vale F.C. players
Preston North End F.C. players
Rotherham United F.C. players
Bradford City A.F.C. players
Shrewsbury Town F.C. players
Peterborough United F.C. players
Nuneaton Borough F.C. players
Tamworth F.C. players
AFC Telford United players
English Football League players
National League (English football) players
Alumni of Loughborough University
Association football coaches
Stoke City F.C. non-playing staff